In polynomial interpolation of two variables, the Padua points are the first known example (and up to now the only one) of a unisolvent point set (that is, the interpolating polynomial is unique) with minimal growth of their Lebesgue constant, proven to be .
Their name is due to the University of Padua, where they were originally discovered.

The points are defined in the domain . It is possible to use the points with four orientations, obtained with subsequent 90-degree rotations: this way we get four different families of Padua points.

The four families 

We can see the Padua point as a "sampling" of a parametric curve, called generating curve, which is slightly different for each of the four families, so that the points for interpolation degree  and family  can be defined as

Actually, the Padua points lie exactly on the self-intersections of the curve, and on the intersections of the curve with the boundaries of the square . Moreover, for each family of Padua points, two points lie on consecutive vertices of the square ,  points lie on the edges of the square, and the remaining points lie on the self-intersections of the generating curve inside the square.

The four generating curves are closed parametric curves in the interval , and are a special case of Lissajous curves.

The first family 
The generating curve of Padua points of the first family is

If we sample it as written above, we have:

where  when  is even or odd but  is even, 

with

From this follows that the Padua points of first family will have two vertices on the bottom if  is even, or on the left if  is odd.

The second family 
The generating curve of Padua points of the second family is

which leads to have vertices on the left if  is even and on the bottom if  is odd.

The third family 
The generating curve of Padua points of the third family is

which leads to have vertices on the top if  is even and on the right if  is odd.

The fourth family 
The generating curve of Padua points of the fourth family is

which leads to have vertices on the right if  is even and on the top if  is odd.

The interpolation formula 

defined by

where  is the fundamental Lagrange polynomial

The weights  are defined as

References

External links 
 List of publications related to the Padua points and some interpolation software.

Interpolation